The Roman Catholic Archdiocese of Adelaide is a Latin Church metropolitan archdiocese of the Catholic Church in Australia located in Adelaide, South Australia.

Cathedral 

St Francis Xavier's Cathedral, Adelaide is the seat of the Catholic Archbishop of Adelaide.

History 
On 5 April 1842 the Apostolic Vicariate of Adelaide was erected, on territory split from the Apostolic Vicariate of New Holland and Van Diemen's Land (the later primatial Archdiocese of Sydney), both missionary pre-diocesan jurisdictions. It was promoted as the Diocese of Adelaide two weeks later on 22 April 1842, just six years after the first fleet arrived to Glenelg.

In 1845 it lost territory to establish the Apostolic Vicariate of King George Sounde - The Sound, which it recuperated in 1847 at the vicariate's suppression.
 
On 10 May 1887 it was promoted as the Archdiocese of Adelaide, while losing territory to establish the Roman Catholic Diocese of Port Augusta.

It had a papal visit from Pope John Paul II in  November 1986.

On 19 March 2020, Patrick O'Regan was announced by Pope Francis to be the 12th Archbishop of Adelaide.

Province 
The Roman Catholic Ecclesiastical Province of Adelaide comprises the metropolitan's own archdiocese and these suffragan dioceses: 
 Roman Catholic Diocese of Darwin 
 Roman Catholic Diocese of Port Pirie

Bishops

Ordinaries 
The following individuals have been elected as Roman Catholic Archbishop of Adelaide, or any of its precursor titles:
 Francis Murphy, Apostolic vicar (5 April 1842 - 1843)

{| class="wikitable"
!Order
!Name
!Title
!Date enthroned
!Reign ended
!Term of office
!Reason for term end
|-
|align="center"| ||Francis Murphy (see above) †||Bishop of Adelaide ||align="center" |22 April 1842 ||align="center" |28 Apr 1858 ||align="right"| ||Died in office 
|-
|align="center"| ||Patrick Geoghegan, O.F.M. Ref. †||Bishop of Adelaide ||align="center" |15 April 1859 ||align="center"|10 March 1864 ||align="right"| ||Elected as Bishop of Goulburn
|-
|align="center"| ||Laurence Sheil, O.F.M. Ref. † ||Bishop of Adelaide ||align="center" |23 June 1865 ||align="center"|1 March 1872 ||align="right"| ||Died in office 
|-
|rowspan="2" align="center"| ||rowspan="2" |Christopher Reynolds †||Bishop of Adelaide ||align="center" |25 May 1873 ||align="center"|10 May 1887 ||align="right"| ||Elevated as Archbishop of Adelaide 
|-
|Archbishop of Adelaide ||align="center" |10 May 1887 ||align="center" |16 June 1893 ||align="right"| ||Died in office
|-
|align="center"| ||John O'Reily †||Archbishop of Adelaide ||align="center" |5 January 1895 ||align="center"|6 July 1915 ||align="right"| ||Died in office 
|-
|rowspan="2" align="center"| ||rowspan="2" |Robert Spence, O.P. †||Coadjutor Archbishop of Adelaide ||align="center" |2 May 1914 ||align="center"|6 July 1915 ||align="right"| ||Succeeded as Archbishop of Adelaide
|-
|Archbishop of Adelaide ||align="center" |6 July 1915 ||align="center"|5 November 1934 ||align="right"| ||Died in office 
|-
|rowspan="2" align="center"| ||rowspan="2" |Andrew Killian †||Coadjutor Archbishop of Adelaide ||align="center" |11 July 1933 ||align="center"|5 November 1934 ||align="right"| ||Succeeded as Archbishop of Adelaide
|-
|Archbishop of Adelaide ||align="center" |5 November 1934 ||align="center" |28 June 1939 ||align="right"| ||Died in office 
|-
|align="center"| ||Matthew Beovich †||Archbishop of Adelaide ||align="center" |11 December 1939 ||align="center"|1 May 1971 ||align="right"| ||Retired and appointed Archbishop Emeritus of Adelaide 
|-
|rowspan="3" align="center"| ||rowspan="3" |James William Gleeson †||Auxiliary Bishop of Adelaide ||align="center" |15 February 1957 ||align="center" |6 July 1964 ||align="right"| ||Elevated as Coadjutor Archbishop of Adelaide
|-
|Coadjutor Archbishop of Adelaide ||align="center" |6 July 1964 ||align="center" |1 May 1971 ||align="right"| ||Succeeded as Archbishop of Adelaide
|-
|Archbishop of Adelaide ||align="center" |1 May 1971 ||align="center" |19 June 1985 ||align="right"| ||Resigned and appointed Archbishop Emeritus of Adelaide 
|-
|rowspan="2" align="center"| ||rowspan="2" |Leonard Faulkner †||Coadjutor Archbishop of Adelaide ||align="center" |2 September 1983 ||align="center"|19 June 1985 ||align="right"| ||Succeeded as Archbishop of Adelaide
|-
|Archbishop of Adelaide ||align="center" |19 June 1985 ||align="center" |3 December 2001 ||align="right"| ||Retired and appointed Archbishop Emeritus of Adelaide 
|-
|rowspan="2" align="center"| ||rowspan="2" |Philip Wilson † ||Coadjutor Archbishop of Adelaide ||align="center" |30 November 2000 ||align="center"|3 December 2001 ||align="right"| ||Succeeded as Archbishop of Adelaide
|-
|Archbishop of Adelaide ||align="center" |3 December 2001 ||align="center" |30 July 2018 ||align="right"| ||Resigned 
|-
|align="center"|12  || Patrick O'Regan || Archbishop of Adelaide ||align=center|25 May 2020 ||align="center" |Incumbent ||align="right"| ||
|}
Note: On 3 June 2018 Pope Francis named Bishop Gregory O’Kelly, S.J. of Port Pirie as Apostolic Administrator of Adelaide.  This occurred after Archbishop Philip Wilson was initially found guilty of concealing child-abuse on 22 May 2018 and did not resign.  Pope Francis eventually accepted his letter of resignation on 30 July 2018.  Wilson's conviction was later overturned on appeal, but he did not return to the role.

Coadjutors are included in the above table.

Auxiliary bishops

Other priest of this diocese who became bishop
Charles Victor Emmanuel Gauci, appointed Bishop of Darwin in 2018

Sexual abuse cases 

Father Albert Davis (died 2007), a member of the Dominican Fathers, was charged in 2006 with 17 incidents of indecent assault involving seven boys at Blackfriars Priory School from 1956 to 1960. Davis was committed to stand trial in the Adelaide District Court, but he died before proceedings were commenced.

Father Charles Barnett pleaded guilty in 2009 (after extradition from Indonesia) to three child sex charges for events from 1977 to 1985 at Crystal Brook and Port Pirie.

In September 2011, Senator Nick Xenophon used parliamentary privilege to name an Adelaide priest as the alleged perpetrator of sexual assaults on John Hepworth about 50 years earlier. Senator Xenophon alleged that the Vicar-General of Adelaide, Monsignor David Cappo, had been provided with detailed allegations in 2008 but had failed to act upon them, the investigations still being "at a preliminary stage" and the priest concerned not being stood down during the investigation. An independent inquiry by Michael Abbott QC reported that there was no substance to the allegations, although Hepworth had declined to be interviewed for the inquiry.

See also 

 Roman Catholicism in Australia
 Catholic schools in South Australia

References

External links
 Catholic Archdiocese of Adelaide
 GigaCatholic, with incumbent biography links
 
 CatholicHierarchy

Adelaide
Religious organizations established in 1843
Adelaide, Roman Catholic Archdiocese of
1843 establishments in Australia
Adelaide
Organisations based in Adelaide